The 2010 Judo World Masters World Masters was held in Suwon, South Korea, from 16 to 17 January 2010.

Medal summary

Medal table

Men's events

Women's events

References

External links
 

IJF World Masters
World Masters
Judo
Judo competitions in South Korea
Judo